Eriksdotter (daughter of Erik) may refer to:

Anna Eriksdotter (Bielke) (1490–1525), Swedish noble, commander of the city and castle of Kalmar during the Swedish rebellion against Denmark
Barbro Eriksdotter (died 1553), known as Barbro Påle, Swedish noble and landowner
Constantia Eriksdotter (1560–1649), the illegitimate daughter of Eric XIV of Sweden and Agda Persdotter
Ebba Eriksdotter Vasa (1491–1549), Swedish noblewoman
Inger Eriksdotter (1100–1157), the wife of Asser Rig, tribal chief of Zealand (Sjælland) in today's Denmark
Ingeborg Eriksdotter of Denmark, Danish princess, Queen of Norway ( – 1287)
Ingeborg Eriksdotter of Sweden ( – ), princess and duchess, daughter of King Eric X of Sweden, mother of King Valdemar I of Sweden
Katarina Eriksdotter (12th-century), Swedish princess, daughter of King Eric the Saint and his queen, Christina of Sweden
Lisa Eriksdotter (born 1733 in Kalanti), Finnish preacher of the Rukoilevaisuus (Great Awakening)
Margareta Eriksdotter (1516–1551), Queen of Sweden from 1536 to 1551 by marriage to King Gustav I
Margareta Eriksdotter Vasa (1497–1536), Swedish noblewoman, sister of king Gustav I of Sweden
Martha Eriksdotter (Märta Bonde), alleged daughter of Erik X, King of Sweden, flourishing in the first half of the 13th century
Ragnhild Eriksdotter (died c. 984), daughter of Eric Bloodaxe and his wife, Gunnhild
Sigrid Eriksdotter Vasa (1566–1633), Swedish princess, the legitimized daughter of King Eric XIV of Sweden and Karin Månsdotter
Valborg Eriksdotter (1545–1580), the royal mistress of Magnus, Duke of Östergötland, between 1560 and 1567
Virginia Eriksdotter (1559–1633), Swedish noble